This is a list of township-level divisions of the province of Gansu, People's Republic of China (PRC).

Lanzhou

Chengguan District
Subdistricts:
 Baiyin Road Subdistrict (白银路街道), Caoyang Street Subdistrict (草场街街道), Donggang East Road Subdistrict (东岗西路街道), Donggang Subdistrict (东岗街道), Fulongping Subdistrict (伏龙坪街道), Gaolan Road Subdistrict (皋兰路街道), Gongxingdun Subdistrict (拱星墩街道), Guangwumen Subdistrict (广武门街道), Jiaojiawan Subdistrict (焦家湾街道), Jiayuguan Road Subdistrict (嘉峪关路街道), Jingyuan Road Subdistrict (靖远路街道), Jiuquan Road Subdistrict (酒泉路街道), Linxia Road Subdistrict (临夏路街道), Qingbaishi (青白石街道), Railway Station Subdistrict (火车站街道), Tielu Dongcun Subdistrict (铁路东村街道), Tielu Xicun Subdistrict (铁路西村街道), Tuanjie Xincun (团结新村街道), Weiyuan Road Subdistrict (渭源路街道), Wuquan Subdistrict (五泉街道), Yanbei Subdistrict (雁北街道), Yanchang Road Subdistrict (盐场路街道), Yannan Subdistrict (雁南街道), Yantan Subdistrict (雁南街道), Zhangye Road Subdistrict (张掖路街道)

Others:
 High-tech Zone(), Gansu Agricultural Reclamation Group(), Gansu Prison Enterprise Group Company (甘肃监狱企业集团公司)

Qilihe District

Subdistricts:
 Xiyuan Subdistrict, Xihu Subdistrict, Jianlanlu Subdistrict, Dunhuanglu Subdistrict, Xizhan Subdistrict, Yanjiaping Subdistrict, Gongjiawan Subdistrict, Tumendun Subdistrict, Xiuchuan Subdistrict

Towns:
 A'gan(), Bali(), Pengjiaping(), Xiguoyuan(), Huangyu()

Townships:
 Weiling Township()

Xigu District

Subdistricts:
 Chenping Subdistrict, Xianfenglu Subdistrict, Fulilu Subdistrict, Xigucheng Subdistrict, Sijiqing Subdistrict, Lintaojie Subdistrict, Xiliugou Subdistrict, Xin'anlu Subdistrict
Towns:
 Xincheng(), Dongchuan(), Hekou(), Dachuan(), Liuquan()

Townships:
 Jingou Township()

Anning District

Subdistricts:
 Peili Subdistrict, Xilu Subdistrict, Shajingyi Subdistrict, Shilidian Subdistrict, Kongjiaya Subdistrict, Yintanlu Subdistrict, Liujiabao Subdistrict, Anningbao Subdistrict

Honggu District

Subdistricts:
 Yaojie Subdistrict, Xiayao Subdistrict, Kuangqu Subdistrict, Hualong Subdistrict

Towns:
 Haishiwan(), Huazhuang(), Ping'an(), Honggu()

Yongdeng County

Towns:
 Chengguan, Hongcheng, Zhongbao, Wushengyi, Heqiao, Liancheng, Kushui, Datong, Longquansi(), Shuping(), Shangchuan(), Liushu(), Tongyuan()

Townships:
 Pingcheng Township(), Minle Township(), Qishan Township()

Gaolan County

Towns:
 Shidong, Zhonghe, Shichuan, Jiuhe, Shuifu, Heishi

Yuzhong County

Towns:
 Chengguan, Xiaguanying, Gaoya, Jinya, Heping, Gancaodian, Qingcheng, Dingyuan, Lianda(), Xinying(), Gongjing()

Townships:
 Xiaokangying Township(), Mapo Township(), Qingshuiyi Township(), Longquan Township, Weiying Township(), Zhonglianchuan Township(), Yuanzicha Township, Shanghuacha Township(), Haxian Township()

Lanzhou New Area

Towns:
 Zhongchuan, Qinchuan, Xicha

Jiayuguan

Districts:
 Xiongguan District, Jingtie District. Changcheng District

Towns:
 Xincheng(), Yuquan(), Wenshu()

Jinchang

Jinchuan District
Six subdistricts:
Binhelu, Guilinlu, Beijinglu, Jinchuanlu, Xinhualu, Guangzhoulu

Two towns:
Ningyuanbu, Shuangwan

Yongchang County
Six towns:
Chengguan, Hexibu, Xinchengzi, Zhuwangbu, Dongzhai, Shuiyuan

Four townships:
Hongshanyao, Jiaojiazhuang, Liuba, Nanba

Baiyin

Baiyin District

Subdistricts:
 Renminlu Subdistrict, Gongyuanlu Subdistrict, Silonglu Subdistrict, Gongnonglu Subdistrict, Fangzhilu Subdistrict

Towns:
 Shuichuan(), Silong(), Wangxian()

Townships:
 Qiangwan Township(), Wuchuan Township()

Pingchuan District

Subdistricts:
 Changzheng Subdistrict, Dianlilu Subdistrict, Honghuilu Subdistrict, Xingpinglu Subdistrict

Towns:
 Wangjiashan(), Shuiquan(), Gonghe(), Baoji(), Huangqiao()

Townships:
 Zhongtian Township(), Fuxing Township()

Jingyuan County

Towns:
 Beiwan(), Dongwan(), Wulan(), Liuchuan(), Beitan(), Wuhe(), Dalu(), Mitan(), Gaowan(), Pingbao(), Dongsheng(), Shuanglong(), Sandan()

Townships:
 Xinglong Township(), Shimen Township(), Jing'an Township(), Yongxin Township(), Ruoli Township()

Huining County

Towns:
 Huishi(), Guochengyi(), Hepan(), Touzhaizi(), Taipingdian(), Gangouyi(), Houjiachuan(), Chaijiamen(), Hanjiacha(), Liujiazhaizi, Baicaoyuan(), Dagou(), Sifangwu(), Zhongchuan(), Laojunpo(), Pingtouchuan(), Dingjiagou(), Yangyaji(), Zhaijiasuo(), Hanjiaji(), Tumenxia(), Xinyuan(), Caotan(), Xinzhuang()

Townships:
 Dangjiaxian Township(), Baliwan Township(), Tugaoshan Township()

Ethic Townships:
 Xintianbao Hui Township()

Jingtai County

Towns:
 Yitiaoshan(), Luyang(), Shangshawo(), Xiquan(), Caowotan(), Hongshui(), Zhongquan(), Zhenglu()

Townships:
 Sitan Township(), Wufo Township(), Manshuitan Township(), Tiaoshan Township()

Tianshui

Qinzhou District

Subdistricts:
 Dacheng Subdistrict, Qilitun Subdistrict,Dongguan Subdistrict,Zhongcheng Subdistrict, Xiguan Subdistrict,Shimaping Subdistrict,Tianshuijun Subdistrict

Towns:
 Yuquan, Taijing , Jikou, Zaojiao, Wangchuan, Mudan, Guanzi, Pingnan, Tianshui, Niangniangba, Zhongliang, Yangjiasi, Qishou, Damen, Qinling, Huaqi

Maiji District

Subdistricts:
 Daobei Subdistrict, Beidaobu Subdistrict,Qiaonan Subdistrict

Towns:
 Shetang, Mapaoquan , Ganquan, Weinan, Dongcha, Hua'niu, Zhongtan, Xinyang, Yuanlong, Boyang, Maiji, Shifo, Sancha, Hupo, Liqiao, Wulong, Dangchuan 

Others:
 Tianshui Economic Development Zone, Tianshui High-tech Industrial Park , Tianshui City Agricultural High-tech Demonstration Zone, Sanyang Industrial Demonstration Zone, Nianpu Industrial Demonstration Zone, Dongkehe Industrial Park

Qingshui County

Towns:
 Yongqing, Hongbao , Baituo, Jinji, Qinting, Shanmen, Baisha, Wanghe, Guochuan, Huangmen, Songshu, Yuanmen, Tumen, Caochuanpu, Longdong

Townships:
 Jiachuan Township(), Fengwang Township(), Xincheng Township()

Others:
 Qingshui County Science and Technology Breeding Demonstration Park

Qin'an County

Towns:
 Xingguo, Lianhua , Xichuan, Longcheng, Guojia, Wuying, Yebao, Weidian, Anfu, Qianhu, Wangyin, Xingfeng, Zhongshan, Liuping, Wangpu, Wangyao, Yunshan

Gangu County

Towns:
 Daxiangshan, Xinxing , Pan'an, Liufeng, Anyuan, Jinshan, Dashi, Lixin, Wujiahe, Dazhuang, Gupo, Baliwan, Xiping

Townships:
 Xiejiawan Township(), Baijiawan Township

Wushan County

Towns:
 Chengguan, Luomen , Yuanyang, Tange, Simen, Mali, Shandan, Wenquan, Hualin, Longtai, Yupan, Gaolou, Yanghe

Townships:
 Zuitou Township(), Yan'an Township

Zhangjiachuan Hui Autonomous County

Towns:
 Zhangjiachuan, Longshan , Gongmen, Malu, Liangshan, Maguan, Liubao, Huchuan, Dayang, Chuanwang

Townships:
 Zhangmian Township(), Muhe Township, Lianwu Township(), Ping'an Township, Yanjia Township()

Wuwei

Liangzhou District

Subdistricts:
 Dongdajie Subdistrict, Xidajie Subdistrict,Dongguanjie Subdistrict,Xiguanjie Subdistrict, Huochezhanjie Subdistrict, Dizhixincunjie Subdistrict,Ronghuajie Subdistrict,Xuanwujie Subdistrict,Huangyanghe Subdistrict

Towns:

Others:
 Jiuduntan Headquarters(), Dengmaying Lake Ecological Construction Headquarters()

Minqin County

Towns:
 Sanlei, Dongba , Quanshan, Xiqu, Donghu, Hongshagang, Changning, Chongxing, Xuebai, Daba, Suwu, Datan, Shuangcike, Hongshaliang, Caiqi, Jiahe, Shoucheng, Nanhu

Gulang County

Towns:
 Gulang, Sishui , Tumen, Dajing, Peijiaying, Haizitan, Dingning, Huangyangchuan, Heisongyi, Yongfengtan, Huanghuatan, Xijing, Minquan , Zhitan, Gufeng

Townships:
 Xinpu Township(), Gancheng Township, Hengliang Township(), Shibalipu Township()

Tianzhu Tibetan Autonomous County

Towns:
 Huazangsi, Dachaigou , Anyuan, Tanshanling, Haxi, Saishensi, Shimen, Songshan, Tiantang, Doshi, Xidatan, Zhuaxixiulong, Dahonggou , Qilian

Townships:
 Dongping Township(), Sailalong Township, Dongdatan Township(), Maozang Township(), Danma Township()

Others:
 Tianzhu Building Material Factory, Tianzhu Coal and Electricity Company

Zhangye

Ganzhou District

Subdistricts:
 Dongjie Subdistrict(), Nanjie Subdistrict, Xijie Subdistrict(), Beijie Subdistrict(), Huochezhan Subdistrict()

Towns:
 Liangjiadun, Shangqin , Daman, Shajing, Wujiang, Ganjun, Xindun, Dangzhai, Jiantan, Sanzha, Xiaoman, Mingyong, Chang'an 
Townships:
 Longqu Township(), Anyang Township, Huazhai Township(), Jing'an Township()

Ethnic Townships:
 Pingshanhu Mongol Township()

Others:
 Zhangye Economic and Technological Development Zone()

Sunan Yugu Autonomous County

Towns:
 Hongwansi, Huangcheng , Kangle

Townships:
 Dahe Township(), Minghua Township

Ethnic Townships:
 Mati Tibetan Township(), Baiyin Mongol Township(), Qifeng Tibetan Township

Others:
 Gansu Sheep Breeding Farm(), Zhangye Baopinghe Ranch

Minle County

Towns:
 Hongshui, Liuba , Xintian, Nangu(), Yonggu, Sanbao(), Nanfeng(), Minlian, Shunhua(), Fengle

Others:
 Minle Ecological Industrial Park()

Linze County

Towns:
 Shahe, Xinhua , Liaoquan, Pingchuan(), Banqiao, Ya'nuan(), Nijiaying
Others:
 State-owned Linze Farm, Wuquan Forest Farm(), Shahe Forest Farm, Koizumizi Sand Control Station(), Gardening field(), Seed breeding ground

Gaotai County

Towns:
 Chengguan, Xuanhua , Nanhua, Hangdao(), Heli, Luotuocheng(), Xinba, Heiquan(), Luocheng

Others:
 Gansu Gaotai Industrial Park

Shandan County

Towns:
 Qingquan, Weiqi , Huocheng, Chenhu, Damaying, Dongle()

Townships:
 Laojun, Liqiao()

Others:
 State-owned Shandan Farm, Shandan Racecourse of China Animal Husbandry Company

Pingliang

Kongtong District

Subdistricts:
 Zhonghualu Subdistrict, Yongdinglu Subdistrict, Futailu Subdistrict

Towns:
 Kongdong(), Baishui(), Caofeng(), Anguo(), Liuhu(), Sishilipu(), Huasuo()

Townships:
 Suoluo Township(), Xianglian Township(), Xiyang Township(), Daqin Township(), Baimiao Township(), Zhaihe Township(), Dazhai Township(), Shangyang Township, Mawu Township(), Xiamen Township()

Others:
 Pingliang Kongtong Mountain Scenic Area Management Committee()

Jingchuan County

subdistrictss:
 Chengshishequ  Subdistrict

Towns:
 Chengguan, Yudu , Gaoping, Libao, Wangcun, Yaodian, Feiyun, Fengtai, Dangyuan, Shefeng, Taiping

Townships:
 Luohandong Township(), Jingming Township(), Honghe Township

Others:
 Zhanglaosi Farm()

Lingtai County

Subdistricts:
 Chengshishequ  Subdistrict
Towns:
 Zhongtai, Shaozhai , Dudian, Shizi, Chaona, Xitun, Shangliang, Baili, Puwo

Townships:
 Xinkai Township(), Liangyuan Township(), Longmen Township(), Xinghuo Township()

Others:
 Wanbaochuan Farm()

Chongxin County

Subdistricts:
 Chengshishequ  Subdistrict

Towns:
 Jinping, Xinyao , Boshu, Huangzhai

Townships:
 Huanghua Township(), Mulin Township

Zhuanglang County

Subdistricts:
 Shuiluo  Subdistrict

Towns:
 Shuiluo, Nanhu , Zhudian, Wanquan, Handian, Wolong, Yangchuan, Pan'an, Dazhuang, Tonghua, Yongning, Liangyi, Yuebao , Liuliang, Nanping

Townships:
 Yanghe Township(), Zhaodun Township(), Zhenghe Township

Jingning County

Subdistricts:
 Chengqu  Subdistrict

Towns:
 Chengguan, Weirong , Jieshipu, Bali, Lidian, Gucheng, Renda, Gangou, Chengchuan, Caowu, Leida, Sihe, Xixiang , Shuangxian, Zhiping, Hongsi, Yuan'an

Townships:
 Siqiao Township(), Yuwan Township, Jiahe Township(), Shengou Township(), Xindian Township(), Sanhe Township(), Lingzhi Township()

Huating City

Subdistricts:
 Donghua  Subdistrict

Towns:
 Donghua, Ankou , Xihua, Maxia, Cedi, Shangguan, Hexi

Townships:
 Shenyu Township(), Shanzhai Township(), Yanxia Township

Others:
 Shibaozi Development Zone Management Committee()

Jiuquan

Suzhou District

Subdistricts:
 Dongbeijie Subdistrict, Dongnanjie Subdistrict, Gongyeyuan Subdistrict, Xincheng Subdistrict, Xibeijie Subdistrict, Xi'nanjie Subdistrict, Yuguanjushenghuojidi Subdistrict

Towns:
 Xidong(), Qingshui(), Zongzhai(), Jinfosi(), Shangba(), Sandun(), Yinda(), Xifeng(), Quanhu(), Guoyuan(), Xiaheqing(), Huajian(), Dongdong(), Fengle()

Townships:
 Huangnibao Township()

Others:
 State-owned Xiaheqing Farm(), Jiuquan Economic and Technological Development Zone(), Base 10

Jinta County

Towns:
 Zhongdong(), Dingxin(), Jinta(), Dongba(), Hangtian(), Dazhuangzi(), Xiba()

Townships:
 Gucheng Township(), Yangjingziwan Township()

Others:
 Gansu Yasheng Agriculture and Industry Group Co., Ltd.(), Industrial Park Management Committee()

Guazhou County

Towns:
 Yuanquan(), Liuyuan(), Sandaogou(), Nancha(), Suoyang(), Guazhou(), Xihu(), Hedong(), Shuangta()

Ethnic Towns:
 Yaozhanzi Dongxiang Town()

Townships:
 Bulongji Township(), Lianghu Township()

Ethnic Towns:
 Qidun Huizu Dongxiangzu Township(), Guangzhi zangzu Township(), Shahe Huizu Township

Others:
 State-owned Xiaowan Farm

Subei Mongol Autonomous County

Two towns:
Dangchengwan and Mazongshan

Two townships:
Shibaocheng and Yanchiwan

Aksai Kazakh Autonomous County

Towns:
 Hongliuwan()

Townships:
 Akeqi Township(), Alteng Township(), Aina Township()

Others:
 Aksai County Industrial Park Management Committee

Yumen City

Subdistricts:
 Xinshiqu Subdistrict

Towns:
 Yumen(), Chijin(), Huahai(), Laojunmiao(), Huangzhawan(), Xiaxihao(), Liuhe(), Changma(), Liuhu(), Liudun()

Ethnic Townships:
 Xiaojinwan Dongxiang Township, Dushanzi Dongxiang  Township (

Others:
 State-owned Horse Drinking Farm(), State-owned Yellow Flower Farm Dongxiangzu Township(), Gansu Nongken Yusheng Agricultural Company(), Gansu Provincial Agricultural Reclamation Construction Engineering Company(), Gansu mining area()

Dunhuang
Nine towns:
Qili, Shazhou, Suzhou, Mogao, Zhuanqukou, Yangguan, Yueyaquan, Guojiabao/bu/pu, Huangqu

Two other areas:
Guoying Dunhuang Farm (国营敦煌农场), Qinghai Oil Management Office Life Base (青海石油管理局生活基地)

Qingyang

Xifeng District

Subdistricts:
 Beijie Banshichu Subdistrict, Nanjie Banshichu Subdistrict, Xijie Banshichu Subdistrict

Towns:
 Xiaojin, Dongzhi , Houguanzhai, Pengyuan, Wenquan

Townships:
 Shishe Township(), Xiansheng Township()

Qingcheng County

Towns:
 Qingcheng, Yima , Sanshilipu, Maling, Xuanma, Baimapu , Tongchuan, Chicheng, Gaolou

Townships:
 Taibailiang Township(), Tuqiao Township(), Caikouji Township(), Nanzhuang Township(), Zhaijiahe Township(), Caijiamiao Township()

Huan County

Towns:
 Huancheng, Quzi , Tianshui, Mubo, Hongde, Hedao , Hudong, Maojing, Fanjiachuan, Chedao 

Townships:
 Tianchi Township(), Yanwu Township(), Bazhu Township(), Gengwan Township(), Qintuanzhuang Township(), Shancheng Township(), Nanqiu Township(), Luoshanchuan Township(), Xiaonangou Township(), Lujiawan Township()

Others:
 Siheyuan Tourism Development Office()

Huachi County

Towns:
 Yuele, Rouyuan , Yuancheng, Nanliang, Chenghao, Wujiao 

Townships:
 Shangliyuan Township(), Wangzuizi Township(), Baima Township(), Huai'an Township(), Qiaochuan Township(), Qiaohe Township(), Shanzhuang Township(), Linzhen Township(), Zifangpan Township()

Heshui County

Towns:
 Xihuachi, Laocheng , Taibai, Banqiao, Hejiapan, Jixian , Xiaozui, Gucheng 

Townships:
 Duanjiaji Township(), Tai'e Township(), Dianzi Township(), Haozuipu Township()

Zhengning County

Towns:
 Shanhe, Yulinzi , Gonghe, Yonghe, Yongzheng, Zhoujia , Qiutou, Xipo 

Townships:
 Wuqingyuan Township(), Sanjia Township()

Ning County

Towns:
 Xinning, Pingzi , Zaosheng, Changqingqiao, Hesheng, Xiangle , Xinzhuang, Panke , Zhongcun , Jiaocun, Miqiao, Liangping, Taichang , Chunrong

Townships:
 Nanyi Township(), Waxie Township(), Jincun Township(), Jiuxian Township

Zhenyuan County

Towns:
 Chengguan, Tunzi , Mengba, Sancha, Pingquan, Kaibian , Taiping, Linjing , Xincheng , Shangxiao, Xinji, Maqu, Miaoqu 

Townships:
 Nanchuan Township(), Fangshan Township(), Yinjiacheng Township(), Wugou Township, Guoyuan Township(), Zhongyuan Township

Dingxi

Anding District

Subdistricts:
 Zhonghualu Subdistrict, Yongdinglu Subdistrict, Futailu Subdistrict

Towns:
 Fengxiang, Neiguanying , Cangkou, Chenggouyi, Lujiagou, Xigongyi, Ningyuan, Lijiabao, Tuanjie, Xiangquan, Fujiachuan, Gejiacha

Townships:
 Bailu Township(), Shixiawan Township(), Xinji Township(), Qinglanshan Township(), Gaofeng Township(), Shiquan Township(), Xingyuan Township()

Tongwei County

Towns:
 Pingxiang, Maying , Jichuan, Bangluo, Changjiahe, Yigangchuan, Longyang, Longshan, Longchuan, Biyu, Xiangnan, Shichuan, Huajialing , Beichengpu

Townships:
 Xinjing Township(), Lijiadian Township(), Disanpu Township(), Sizichuan Township()

Longxi County

Towns:
 Gongchang, Wenfeng , Shouyang, Caizi, Fuxing, Tonganyi, Yuntian, Biyan, Mahe, Kezhai, Shuangquan, Quanjiawan

Townships:
 Weiyang Township(), Hongwei Township(), Heping Township(), Dexing Township(), Yongji Township()

Weiyuan County

Towns:
 Qingyuan, Lianfeng , Huichuan, Wuzhu, Luyuan, Beizhai, Xinzhai, Majiaji, Shadeyu, Qingping, Qijiamiao, Shangwan

Townships:
 Da'an Township(), Qinqi Township(), Xiacheng Township(), Tianjiahe Township

Lintao County

Towns:
 Taoyang, Balipu , Xintian, Xindian, Taishi, Zhongpu, Xiakou, Longmen, Yaodian, Yujing, Yaxiaji, Nanping

Townships:
 Hongqi Township(), Shangying Township(), Kangjiaji Township(), Zhantan Township, Manwa Township(), Lian'erwan Township()

Zhang County

Towns:
 Wuyang, Sancha , Xinsi, Jinzhong, Yanjing, Panhuqiao, Dacaotan, Sizu, Shichuan, Guiqingshan

Townships:
 Maquan Township(), Wudang Township(), Dongquan Township()

Min County

Towns:
 Minyang, Buma , Xizhai, Meichuan, Xijiang, Lujing, Shili, Chabu, Zhongzhai, Qingshui, Sigou , Mazichuan, Weixin, Hetuo, Mawu

Townships:
 Qinxu Township(), Shendu Township(), Suolong Township()

Longnan

Wudu District

Subdistricts:
 Zhongluo Subdistrict, Jishiba Subdistrict,Jiangbei Subdistrict,Jiangnan Subdistrict

Towns:
 Chengguan, Anhua , Dongjiang, Liangshui, Hanwang, Luotang, Jiaogong, Majie, Sanhe, Ganquan, Yulong, Pipa, Waina, Maying, Bolin, Yaozhai, Foya, Shimen, Wuma, Yuhe, Hanlin, Jugan , Longxing, Huangping, Wuku, Sancang

Townships:
 Puchi Township(), Chiba Township(), Longba Township(), Longfeng Township(), Yuhuang Township(), Guohe Township(), Fengxiang Township(), Yuezhao Township()

Ethnic Townships:
 Pingya Tibetan Township(), Moba Tibetan Township()

Cheng County

Towns:
 Chengguan, Huangzhu , Hongchuan, Xiaochuan, Zhifang, Paosha, Diancun, Wangmo, Chenyuan, Shaba, Huangchen, Jifeng, Suyuan, Suochi

Townships:
 Songping Township(), Erlang Township(), Luohe Township()

Wen County

Towns:
 Chengguan, Bikou , Shangde, Zhongzhai, Linjiang, Qiaotou, Liping, Tianchi, Baoziba, Shifang, Shijiba, Danbao, Zhongmiao, Fanba

Townships:
 Liujiaping Township(), Yulei Township(), Koutouba Township(), Jianshan Township(), Sheshu Township()

Ethnic Township:
 Tielou Tibetan Township()

Dangchang County

Towns:
 Chengguan, Hadapu , Lichuan, Nanyang, Guanting, Shawan, Awu, Nanhe, Bali, Linjiangpu, Lianghekou

Townships:
 Mu'er Township(), Pangjia Township(), Hejiabao Township(), Jiahe Township(), Jiangtai Township(), Chela Township(), Haodi Township(), Hanyuan Township(), Zhuyuan Township(), Xinghua Township(), Ganjiangtou Township(), Xinzhai Township(), Shizi Township()

Ethnic Townships:
 Xinchengzi Tibetan Township()

Kang County

Towns:
 Chengguan, Pinluo , Dabao, Anmenkou, Lianghe, Changba, Yuntai, Yangba, Wangba, Nianba, Douba, Wangguan , Dananyu, Zhoujiaba, Sitai, Baiyang, Tongqian, Sanheba

Townships:
 Miba Township(), Dianzi Township(), Taishi Township()

Xihe County

Towns:
 Hanyuan, Changdao , Heba, Jiangxi, Shixia, Luoyu, Xiyu, Mayuan, Daqiao, Shili, Shibao, Xinglong, Suhe, Luhe, Shaoyu, Xigaoshan

Townships:
 Shajing Township(), Haolin Township(), Taishihe Township(), Liuxiang Township()

Li County

Towns:
 Chengguan, Yanguan , Shiqiao, Baihe, Kuanchuan, Yongxing, Qishan, Honghe, Yongping, Zhongba, Luoba, Leiba, Yacheng, Taoping, Longlin, Gucheng, Jiangkou, Qiushan, Baiguan, Qiaotou, Wangba, Tanping 

Townships:
 Mahe Township(), Shangping Township(), Leiwang Township(), Shajin Township(), Caoping Township(), Xiaoliang Township(), Sanyu Township()

Hui County

Towns:
 Chengguan, Fujia , Jiangluo, Niyang, Liulin, Jialing, Yongning, Yinxingshu, Shuiyang, Lichuan, Mayanhe, Gaoqiao, Dahedian

Townships:
 Yushu Township(), Yuguan Township()

Liangdang County

Towns:
 Chengguan, Zhan'erxiang , Xipo, Yangdian, Xianlong, Yunping

Townships:
 Zuojia Township(), Yuchi Township(), Xinghua Township(), Zhangjia Township(), Taishan Township(), Jindong Township()

Linxia Hui Autonomous Prefecture

Linxia City

Subdistricts:
 Chengnan Subdistrict, Chengbei Subdistrict,Dongguan Subdistrict,Xiguan Subdistrict, Bafang Subdistrict,Hongyuan Subdistrict,Dongqu Subdistrict

Towns:
 Chengjiao, Yanhan, Nanlong, Zheqiao

Linxia County)

Towns:
 Hanji, Tuqiao, Maji, Lianhua, Xinji, Yinji, Diaoqi, Beiyuan, Huangniwan

Townships:
 Yingtan Township(), Zhangzigou Township(), Manisigou Township(), Monigou Township(), Manlu Township(), Yulin Township(), Jinggou Township(), Potou Township(). Qiaosi Township(), Xianfeng Township(), Hexi Township(), Anjiapo Township(), Nanyuan Township(), Hongtai Township(), Lupan Township(), Minzhu Township()

Kangle County

Towns:
 Fucheng, Suji, Rouge, Jinggu, Lianlu

Townships:
 Kangfeng Township(), Huguan Township(), Ruchuan Township(), Baiwang Township(), Basong Township(), Minglu Township(), Badan Township(), Shangwan Township(). Caotan Township(), Wuhu Township()

Yongjing County

Towns:
 Liujiaxia, Yanguoxia, Taiji, Xihe, Sanyuan, Xianyuan, Chenjing, Sichuan, Wangtai, Hongquan

Townships:
 Guanshan Township(), Xuding Township(), Santiaoxian Township(), Pinggou Township(), Xinsi Township(), Xiaoling Township(), Yangta Township()

Guanghe County

Towns:
 Chengguan, Sanjiaji, Qijiaji, Zhuangkeji, Maijiexiang, Qijia

Townships:
 Shuiquan Township(), Guanfang Township()

Ethic Townships:
 Alimatu Dongxiang Township()

Hezheng County

Towns:
 Chengguan, Sanhe, Sanshilipu, Maijiaji, Songming, Chenjiaji, Luojiaji, Xinying

Townships:
 Liangjiasi Township(), Bujiazhuang Township(),Xinzhuang Township(), Dalang Township()

Dongxiang Autonomous County

Towns:
 Suonan, Daban, Hetan, Naleisi, Tangwang, Guoyuan, Wangji, Longquan

Townships:
 Chuntai Township(), Liushu Township(),Dongyuan Township(), Pingzhuang Township(), Baihe Township(), Guanbu Township(),Zhaojiaxiang Township(), Wujia Township(), Yanling Township(), Fengshan Township(),Chejiawan Township(), Gaoshan Township(), Dashu Township(), Beiling Township(),Kaolei Township(), Dongling Township()

Jishishan Baoanzu Dongxiang Salar Autonomous County

Towns:
 Chuimatan, Dahejia, Juji, Qiecang

Townships:
 Liujixiang Township(), Shiyuan Township(), Liugou Township(),Guanjiachuan Township(), Hulinjia Township(), Anji Township(), Zhaizigou Township(),Guogan Township(), Xuhujia Township(), Zhongzuiling Township(), Xiaoguan Township(),Puchuan Township(), Yinchuan Township()

Gannan Tibetan Autonomous Prefecture

Hezuo City

Subdistricts:
 Dangzhou Subdistrict, Yiheang Subdistrict,Jianmukeer Subdistrict,Tongqin Subdistrict

Towns:
 Nawu, Lexiu, Zogamanma

Townships:
 Kajman Township, Kajiadao, Zuogedoma

Lintan County

Towns:
 Chengguan, Xincheng, Yeliguan, Yangyong, Wangqi, Guzhan, Taobin, Bajiao, Liushun, Dianzi, Yangsha

Townships:
 Shubu Township, Zhuoluo Township, Changchuan Township, Sancha Township, Shimen Township

Zhuoni County

Towns:
 Liulin, Mu'er, Zhagulu, Ka'erqin, Zangbawa, Nalang, Taoyan, Azitan, Shenzang, Wanmao, Niba

Townships:
 Daogao Township, Qia'gai Township, Kangduo Township

Ethic Townships:
 Shaowa Tu Township

Zhouqu County

Towns:
 Chengguan, Dachuan, Fengdie, Lijie, Dongshan, Qugaona, Boyu, Bacang, Hanban, Pingding, Goye, Wuping, Dayu, Jiangpan, Gongba

Townships:
 Quwa Township, Nanyu  Township, Baleng Township, Chagang Township

Diebu County

Towns:
 Dianga, Yiwa, Wangzang, Lazikou, Luoda

Townships:
 Kaba Township, Dala  Township, Ni'ao Township, Axia Township, Duoer  Township, Sangba  Township

Maqu County

Towns:
 Nima, Mangima, Awancang, Qihama, Cerima, Oula

Townships:
 Oulaxiuma Township, Muxihe  Township

Luqu County

Towns:
 Langmusi, Maai, Xicang, Gahai, Shuangcha

Townships:
 Larenguan Township, Ala  Township

Xiahe County
Towns:
 Laboleng / Labrang, Wangge'ertang, Amuquhu, Sangke, Ganjia, Madang, Bola, Kecai

Townships:
 Damai Township, Qu'ao Township, Tangga'ang Township, Zhayou Township, Jicang Township

Other areas:
 Xiahe County Seed Station, Xiahe County Jisi General Station, Xiahe County Sangke Sheep Farm

References

Gansu
 
Townships